Trumpets and Drums is an adaptation of an 18th-century English Restoration comedy by Farquhar, The Recruiting Officer. It was written by the German dramatist Bertolt Brecht in collaboration with Benno Besson and Elisabeth Hauptmann.

It was first performed in 1955 in a production directed by Besson, with music by Rudolf Wagner-Régeny (whose songs for the play have been called "Weill-like" by John Willett). It was the first premiere of Brecht's final season at the Berliner Ensemble. Willett identifies an instance of Brecht's lifelong indebtedness to Rudyard Kipling in the play's "Song of the Women of Gaa."

The production strongly influenced the English director William Gaskill's reinterpretation of Farquhar's original play for the National Theatre.

Synopsis
Brecht offers the following account of the first scene of the play:

References

Sources
 Willett, John. 1967. The Theatre of Bertolt Brecht: A Study from Eight Aspects. Third rev. ed. London: Methuen, 1977. .
 Willett, John and Ralph Manheim, eds. 1972. Collected Plays: Nine. By Bertolt Brecht. Bertolt Brecht: Plays, Poetry, Prose Ser. New York: Vintage. .

Plays by Bertolt Brecht